The Seven Brothers of Lazia are the seven martyred brothers: Orentius, Cyriacus, Firminus, Firmus, Heros, Longinus, and Pharnacius. They were soldiers in the Roman Army, supposedly joined Diocletian's army at Antioch, saw service in Thrace, were condemned for their Christian faith and suffered martyrdom during the persecutions of co-Emperor Maximian.

History 
During the reign of Maximian (r. 284–305) Roman Anatolia faced Scythian invasion. Saint Orentius was ordered to fight against the Scythian warrior Marothom. Orentius defeated Marothom and thus stopped the Schytian invasion. The emperor intended to offer sacrifice to the pagan gods to celebrate the victory and invited Orentius. However, Orentius refused, explaining that he was a Christian. The Emperor gave orders to banish both the saint and his six brothers to the Caucasus. During the journey all seven brothers died from hunger or torture.

Saints 
Orentius, principal martyr; Longinus, final martyr; exiled to Pityus; and five others, all condemned at Satala.

Cult 
St. Orentius' cult and whole tale of the Seven Brothers which also figures in the Menologion of Basil II, represented a Byzantine attempt to incorporate the Laz and Abkhazians into Orthodoxy by the erection of the Metropolis of the Phasis (and later exarchate of Lazia), which is also paralleled by an attempt to discipline them.

References

304 deaths
Saints from Roman Anatolia
4th-century Romans
4th-century Christian martyrs
Groups of Christian martyrs of the Roman era
Year of birth uncertain
Military saints